LYIT may refer to:

 Lan Yang Institute of Technology in Yilan County, Taiwan
 Letterkenny Institute of Technology in County Donegal, Ireland